Statistics of Latvian Higher League in the 1925 season.

Overview
RFK won the championship.

League standings

2nd stage: RFK [Riga] – Olimpija [Liepaja] 4–3

References

RSSSF

1925
Lat
Lat
Football Championship